Mary Louise Court is a bungalow court located at 583-599 N. Mentor Ave. in Pasadena, California. Robert Harris built the court in 1928. The court consists of seven buildings surrounding a central pathway; the buildings contain 14 residential units, with four in the rear building, three in each of the two middle buildings, and one each in the front four buildings. The buildings are designed in the Spanish Colonial Revival style and feature stucco exteriors, Spanish tile roofs, open-arched porches, and curved bracketing around the doors. The stone walkway between the homes is lined by palm trees.

The court was added to the National Register of Historic Places on November 15, 1994.

References

Bungalow courts
Houses in Pasadena, California
Houses completed in 1928
Houses on the National Register of Historic Places in California
National Register of Historic Places in Pasadena, California
Mission Revival architecture in California
Historic districts on the National Register of Historic Places in California